Mississauga—Lakeshore is a provincial electoral district in Ontario, Canada. It elects one member to the Legislative Assembly of Ontario. This riding was formerly known as Mississauga South prior to 2015.

It includes the neighbourhoods of Cawthra, Sheridan Heights, Park Royal, Clarkson, Rattray Park Estates, Lorne Park, Lorne Park Estates, Port Credit, Applewood Acres, Lakeview and Orchard Heights. It has a population of 113,003 and an area of 61 km2.

In 2003, it was defined to consist of the part of the City of Mississauga lying southeast of a line drawn from northeast to southwest along the Queensway to the Credit River, west along the Credit River, and southwest along Dundas Street West to the southwestern city limit.

Members of Provincial Parliament

Electoral history

Once one of the strongest bastions of PC support in the province (winning 61% of the vote as recently as 1999), and certainly in the Toronto area, Mississauga South provincially has become more and more Liberal in last election cycles.

Election results

Mississauga South, 1977-2014

References

Elections Ontario Past Election Results

External links
Map of riding for 2018 election

Ontario provincial electoral districts
Politics of Mississauga